Shinploca is a monotypic moth genus in the family Drepanidae. Its only species, Shinploca shini, is found in the Chinese provinces of Jilin and Shaanxi, south-eastern Russia and the Korean Peninsula. Both the genus and species were described by Sung-Soo Kim in 1995.

References

Moths described in 1995
Thyatirinae
Monotypic moth genera
Moths of Asia
Drepanidae genera